Daniel "Dani" Lasure Briz (born 27 February 1994) is a Spanish footballer who plays as a left back for SD Eibar.

Club career
Born in Zaragoza, Aragón, Lasure played youth football with Real Zaragoza. He made his senior debut with the reserves on 29 September 2013, starting in a 4–0 Tercera División home routing of Atlético Calatayud.

Lasure made his professional debut on 7 September 2016, starting in a 1–2 home loss against Real Valladolid, for the season's Copa del Rey. The following 6 June he renewed his contract until 2021, being definitely promoted to the main squad ahead of the 2017–18 season.

Lasure made his Segunda División debut on 10 June 2017, starting in a 1–2 home loss against CD Tenerife. He subsequently became a regular starter for the side, and scored his first professional goal on 16 September of the following year, but in a 1–2 away loss against UD Almería.

On 16 January 2020, after losing his first-choice status, Lasure was loaned to fellow second division side Tenerife until the end of the season. On 22 September, he moved to fellow league team CD Leganés also in a temporary deal. On 18 March 2021, he was diagnosed with testicular cancer.

On 25 January 2022, already recovered and training with the squad, Lasure renewed with Zaragoza until 2023. He terminated his contract with the club on 4 January 2023, after being rarely used.

On 3 March 2023, after a trial period, Lasure signed a short-term deal with SD Eibar also in the second division.

References

External links

1994 births
Living people
Footballers from Zaragoza
Spanish footballers
Association football defenders
Segunda División players
Segunda División B players
Tercera División players
Real Zaragoza B players
Real Zaragoza players
CD Tenerife players
CD Leganés players
SD Eibar footballers